Kulaghan-e Tuman-e Gholam Hasan (also Romanized as Kūlaghān-e Tūmān-e Gholām Ḩasan; also known as Kūlaqān-e Kūchak) is a village in Qaleh Qazi Rural District, Qaleh Qazi District, Bandar Abbas County, Hormozgan Province, Iran. At the 2006 census, its population was 34, in 6 families.

References 

Populated places in Bandar Abbas County